Tian Liang (born August 27, 1979) is a male Chinese actor and former diver.

Diving career 
Tian won gold in the 10 m platform event in the 2000 Sydney Olympics. In the Summer Olympics 2004, he won the bronze medal in the 10 m platform event and a gold medal in the synchronised platform event.

Since then, he and another gold medal winner, the Chinese female diver Guo Jingjing, often appeared together in public activities. They were better known together as Liang Jingjing (亮晶晶, Tian and Guo's combined given names, synonymous with the word for 'sparkling').

After winning his multiple Olympic medals, Tian received numerous invitations to lend his name and face to corporate promotions. His involvement in commercial activities, and perhaps other disputes with the national team, have led the national team to fire him after repeated warnings. In spite of this, Tian continued to practice diving with a provincial team. He maintained his diving standard and won a medal at the following National Games of China. Although there was great public interest in him rejoining the national team, it did not happen. Tian has since then split his schedule between diving training and public activities. Finally on March 25, 2007, Tian announced his retirement as a diver.

On July 29, 2008, it was announced that Tian would not be rejoining the national team and participating in the 2008 Beijing Olympics.

Filmography
The Bodyguard (2015)
Who Moved My Fiancee (2015)
The Right Mistake (2015)
Emperor's Holidays (2015)
Stealing Legend (2014)
Where Are We Going? Dad (2014)
Badges of Fury (2013)
National Treasure Mystery (2013)
Blame It on the Phone (2013)
On My Way (2012)
Princess's Temptation (2012)
Crazy Shanzhai (2011)
I Love Wing Chun (2011)
A Beautiful Life (2011)
The Fantastic Water Babes (2010)

References

External links
 profile
 Tian's Olympic troubles

1979 births
Living people
Chinese male divers
Divers at the 1996 Summer Olympics
Divers at the 2000 Summer Olympics
Divers at the 2004 Summer Olympics
Olympic bronze medalists for China
Olympic divers of China
Olympic gold medalists for China
Olympic silver medalists for China
Sportspeople from Chongqing
Olympic medalists in diving
Asian Games medalists in diving
Divers at the 1998 Asian Games
Divers at the 2002 Asian Games
Medalists at the 2004 Summer Olympics
Medalists at the 2000 Summer Olympics
World Aquatics Championships medalists in diving
Asian Games gold medalists for China
Medalists at the 1998 Asian Games
Medalists at the 2002 Asian Games
Universiade medalists in diving
21st-century Chinese male actors
Chinese male film actors
Chinese male television actors
Male actors from Chongqing
Universiade gold medalists for China
Medalists at the 2001 Summer Universiade
Medalists at the 2003 Summer Universiade
20th-century Chinese people
21st-century Chinese people